The Central Engraving and Printing Plant (CEPP) is a subsidiary of the Central Bank of the Republic of China (Taiwan). It is responsible for printing the paper bank notes of Taiwan in its currency, the New Taiwan dollar.

History
The company was established in Chungking on 1 February 1941. After 1945, it was relocated to Shanghai and a plant was established in Peking. In 1949, the company was relocated again to Taiwan in Sanchong Township, Taipei County. In 1964, it was relocated to Xindian Township.

Plants
 Ankang Working Site
 Chingtan Working Site

Organizational structures
 Technical Research and Development Division
 Quality Assurance Division
 Occupational Safety and Health Division
 Information Management Office
 Secretariat
 Accounting Office
 Personnel Office
 Procurement and Supply Division
 Ethics Office

Products
Banknotes of New Taiwan dollar printed by the plant are NT$100 note, NT$200 note, NT$500 note, NT$1000 note and NT$2000 note. It also prints certificates such as the Republic of China passports, Exit & Entry Permits, visas, National Identification Cards, land title certificates, diplomas, marriage and divorce certificates, postage stamps, shopping vouchers, postal gift coupons, wine labels, checks, bonds, etc.

See also
 Central Bank of the Republic of China (Taiwan)
 Central Mint

References

1941 establishments in China
1949 establishments in Taiwan
Government-owned companies of Taiwan
Banknote printing companies
Chinese companies established in 1941
Manufacturing companies established in 1941